Monroe Creek (also known as Bartholomew Creek) is a tributary of Tunkhannock Creek in Susquehanna County and Wyoming County, in Pennsylvania, in the United States. The creek is not designated as an impaired waterbody. The surficial geology in its vicinity consists mostly of alluvium, Wisconsinan Till, and other things. Its watershed is designated as a Coldwater Fishery and a Migratory Fishery.

Course

Monroe Creek begins in a pond or small lake in Springville Township, Susquehanna County. It flows south-southeast for several tenths of a mile before turning southwest and passing through a wetland. The creek then turns south for more than a mile, passing through another wetland and entering Nicholson Township, Wyoming County. Here, it turns south-southeast and receives two unnamed tributaries from the right. After several tenths of a mile, it passes Pompey Hill and Dam Hill before turning east and then south-southeast for a few miles. In this reach, the creek receives two unnamed tributaries from the left. It then turns south for several tenths of a mile, leaves its valley, crosses Pennsylvania Route 92, and reaches its confluence with Tunkhannock Creek.

Hydrology
Monroe Creek is not designated as an impaired waterbody.

Geography and geology

The surficial geology near the mouth of Monroe Creek mainly consists of alluvium and alluvial terrace. Further upstream, it consists of alluvium and a till known as Wisconsinan Till, although bedrock consisting of sandstone and shale occurs in the surficial geology on some nearby hills. Further upstream, the surficial geology is fairly similar, but there is a patch of alluvial fan and a wetland near the creek just north of the Susquehanna County line. In the creek's upper reaches, the surficial geology consists of Wisconsinan Till, except for a wetland at the headwaters.

Watershed
The mouth of the creek is in the United States Geological Survey quadrangle of Factoryville. However, its source is in the quadrangle of Hop Bottom. The creek's mouth is located at Starkville.

The designated use for Monroe Creek is aquatic life. In 2006, the creek was a proposed flood debris cleanup site.

History
Monroe Creek was entered into the Geographic Names Information System on August 2, 1979. Its identifier in the Geographic Names Information System is 1192954. The creek is also known as Bartholomew Creek. This variant name appears in Israel C. White's 1883 book The geology of the North Branch Susquehanna River Region in the six counties of Wyoming, Lackawanna, Luzerne, Columbia, Montour and Northumberland.

This bridge is structurally deficient, as of 2013.

Biology
The drainage basin of Monroe Creek is designated as a Coldwater Fishery and a Migratory Fishery.

See also
Oxbow Creek, next tributary of Tunkhannock Creek going downstream
Field Brook, next tributary of Tunkhannock Creek going upstream
List of rivers of Pennsylvania

References

Rivers of Susquehanna County, Pennsylvania
Rivers of Wyoming County, Pennsylvania
Tributaries of Tunkhannock Creek
Rivers of Pennsylvania